Pathologic ( – a pun on Thomas More's Utopia and the Russian word for "plague") is a 2005 role-playing and survival game developed by Russian studio Ice-Pick Lodge. The game was released in Russia by Buka Entertainment in June 2005, followed by a localised English release from G2 Games and GMX Games in 2006. An updated version, Pathologic Classic HD, was developed by General Arcade, published by Good Shepard Entertainment, and released in October 2015. A remake was developed by Ice-Pick Lodge using the Unity game engine and released as Pathologic 2 in May 2019 by tinyBuild.

Gameplay 

The player can choose one of three playable healers, who are listed only by their honorifics: two men, The Bachelor (Daniil Dankovsky), and Haruspex (Artemy Burakh); and a girl – The Devotress, Klara (later re-translated as "The Changeling, Clara"). Only the former two are available at the start of the game, with Clara being unlocked after completing a playthrough of the game with either Daniil or Artemy. The questlines available depend on which character is being played. The two unchosen playable characters are present in the town during the chosen character's playthrough.

Each player character has a different listed goal in their quest book, but the player's only necessary goal is simply to survive to the end of the 12 days by maintaining their resources. The game takes place in a perpetual world over a timeframe of 12 in-game days. Throughout each day, the player receives quests from non-player characters (NPCs); however, the game continues regardless of whether they are completed or not. At exactly midnight of each day, the incomplete quests are erased from the player's notebook. Quests are divided into main missions (one per day), which decide if a major character (referred to in-game as the "Bound") will die, and side quests, which earn money and items. Completing main quests is essential to discovering the secrets of the town, as characters who would otherwise reveal information later in the game can fall ill from the plague early.

Plot 
Regardless of the player's choice in player character, each of the three healers tries to uncover the source of a strange lethal sickness known as the "sand plague" that has befallen a small town. Although players can play as each of them, there is only one base storyline, which is seen from the three different points of views of the chosen player character. Minor plot details will change depending on the player, and the ability to uncover some secrets depends on which character is being played. The player may also interact with the other two unchosen characters and discuss their progress throughout the game. 

The game's fluctuating economy represents the harsh forces of supply and demand in an isolated, disease-ridden town. All districts and major buildings of the town are named after body parts and biology. On the edge of town, there is a great building named Polyhedron, a physically impossible structure used as a fortress by children. On the opposite side lies an ominous cattle-slaughtering Abattoir, with the Apiary (later re-translated as "Termitary") next to it. 

Each character has an assigned group of NPCs - their "Bound" - which they are tasked with keeping safe by completing the main quest every day. 

There are four endings available. Each playable character has a designated ending, although any of these three endings may be chosen if the player completes the optional task of keeping the other healer's Bound healthy by the meeting time on the 12th day. The Bachelor's ending allows the town to be destroyed, saving the miraculous Polyhedron. The Haruspex's ending destroys the Polyhedron to allow the production of a panacea, saving the town. The Devotress/Changeling's ending allows both the Polyhedron and the town to coexist, at the cost of sacrificing some of the townspeople. If the player is unable to keep all of their Bound safe, however, the town becomes overrun by pestilence in the fourth "Bad Ending".

Development and release 
Pathologic was the first game developed by Russian studio Ice-Pick Lodge. The game was announced by Russian publisher Buka Entertainment on 30 March 2004, intending to release in the last quarter of the year. The native Russian version of the game was released to manufacturing on 31 May 2005, for release on 9 June. The English-localised version was completed on 20 November 2005 and released by G2 Games in 2006. A German version was published by Frogster Interactive Pictures on 20 April 2006 after being released to manufacturing earlier that month.

Remake and remaster 

Ice-Pick Lodge stated in November 2013 that it was looking to remake Pathologic and using crowdfunding to finance the development. The developer confirmed the remake's development in July 2014 and launched a Kickstarter crowdfunding campaign that September. This campaign sought to raise , which it reached by the end of the month, and ended in a total of  backed by 7,139 people. In October 2015, Ice-Pick Lodge announced Pathologic Classic HD, a remaster of the original Pathologic developed by General Arcade and published by Gambitious Digital Entertainment. This remaster introduced upgraded visuals, fixed bugs, re-recorded dialog, and a re-translated English script. Pathologic Classic HD was released on 29 October 2015. The remaster received generally favourable reviews, according to Metacritic. Under publisher tinyBuild, the Pathologic remake was retitled Pathologic 2 to distinguish it from Pathologic Classic HD. Pathologic 2 was released on 23 May 2019.

Reception 

In Russia, Pathologic was critically well received, winning year-end accolades from five Russian outlets. However, its reception in English-speaking countries has been varied, being both praised for its atmosphere and concept while equally panned for its poor translation, outdated graphics and slow-paced gameplay.

References

Further reading

External links 

  (archived)

2005 video games
Art games
Fiction about human sacrifice
2000s horror video games
Single-player video games
Survival video games
 Postmodern works
Video games developed in Russia
Video games about viral outbreaks
Video games with alternate endings
Windows games
Medical video games
Self-reflexive video games
Buka Entertainment games
Ice-Pick Lodge games
Frogster Interactive Pictures games
G2 Games games